The Cambodian Youth Party (CYP) is a pro-government party created by Pich Sros. It is known for being one of the parties that called for the Cambodia National Rescue Party (CNRP) to dissolve after allegedly conspiring to overthrow the current government. The party is also one of the twenty parties involved in the Consultation Forum created by current Prime Minister Hun Sen. During its time as part of the forum, the CYP has also managed to conserve the Boeung Prek Toap lake.

Background 
The CYP was created by Pich Sros in December 2015 as a way to focus on the disadvantaged youth in Cambodia, and to create job opportunities and education for them, saying "Youth's interest is the reason I made this party." He aims to do this by running in the next Cambodian general election, scheduled for 29 July 2018.

Recent electoral history

References 

Political parties in Cambodia
Political parties established in 2015